Garven-Michée Metusala (born 31 December 1999) is a professional footballer who plays as a centre-back for Forge FC. Born in Canada, he represents the Haiti national team.

Early life
He began his youth career with Étoiles de L'Est. In 2013, he joined the Montreal Impact Academy, playing there until 2016. Afterwards, he returned to Étoiles de L'Est, where he also played at the senior amateur level with the club in the Ligue de soccer élite du Québec.

Metusala was an assistant captain with Team Quebec at the 2017 Canada Summer Games, where he won the bronze medal.

College career
Metusala spent two years with Dawson College playing for the soccer team, winning the RSEQ bronze medal in 2017.

In 2019, Metusala committed to play for Concordia University. However, he ultimately never appeared for Concordia in a U Sports match, as the 2020 season was cancelled due to the COVID-19 pandemic, although he did participate in the indoor season.

Club career
In 2018, Metusala played for PLSQ side CS St-Hubert. In 2019, he joined fellow PLSQ side CS Fabrose. He won the league cup with Fabrose in 2019. In 2020, after making a single appearance for Fabrose, he joined A.S. Blainville during the COVID-19 pandemic-shortened season, winning the league title.

At the 2021 CPL–U Sports Draft, Metusala was selected in the first round (8th overall) by Forge FC. On 23 June 2021, he signed his first professional contract with the club. On 27 June, Metusala made his debut, as a substitute, in a 2–0 loss to Valour FC. He started his first match on 4 July against Pacific FC. He scored his first goal on 9 August 2021 against Atlético Ottawa. He helped Forge advance to the Championship match in 2021, in which he started, but they were defeated by Pacific FC. In 2022, he won the CPL title with Forge.

International career
Metusala is eligible to represent Canada, Haiti, and the Republic of Congo, through birth, his mother, and father, respectively.

In August 2021, he was contacted by the Haitian Football Federation about joining the Haiti national team. In March 2022, Metusala was called up by the Haiti national football team for a friendly match against Guatemala. He made his international debut on March 28, starting the game and going 85 minutes in a 2–1 loss.

Career statistics

References

External links

1999 births
Living people
Soccer people from Quebec
People from Terrebonne, Quebec
Haitian footballers
Haiti international footballers
Canadian soccer players
Haitian people of Republic of the Congo descent
Canadian sportspeople of Haitian descent
Canadian people of Republic of the Congo descent
Haitian Quebecers
Association football defenders
Forge FC players
Forge FC draft picks
Première ligue de soccer du Québec players
Canadian Premier League players
Dawson College alumni
Concordia Stingers
Concordia University alumni
University and college soccer players in Canada
A.S. Blainville players
CS St-Hubert players
FC Laval players